Same-sex marriage in the Northwest Territories has been legal since July 20, 2005. The Canadian territory began granting marriage licences to same-sex couples upon the granting of royal assent to the federal Civil Marriage Act. The Northwest Territories had been one of only four provinces and territories, with Alberta, Nunavut and Prince Edward Island, where same-sex marriage had not already been legalised by court challenges prior to the passage of the federal law.

Legal proceedings
In December 2004, Justice Minister Charles Dent stated that the Northwest Territories Government would not issue marriage licences to same-sex couples until a court ruling or federal legislation legalised them. However, he indicated that the territory would not contest any lawsuit on the subject, and would comply with such a ruling or law.

On May 20, 2005, a Yellowknife couple, Jason Perrino and Colin Snow, sued the Territorial Government over the right to get married, arguing that refusing them a licence was a violation of their Charter rights. The territorial Supreme Court was supposed to hear the case on May 27, 2005; however, it was adjourned for three weeks at the request of a couple who wanted intervenor status in the case to oppose same-sex marriage. Ruby and Laurin Trudel of Yellowknife applied to intervene in the lawsuit. They had been members of Yellowknife's Evangelical Lutheran Church until it started to share communion and the pulpit with the United Church, a denomination which had begun blessing same-sex unions. The couple was granted intervenor status, and on June 17, 2005, CBC North reported that the intervenors had requested party status in the case. If it had been granted by the territorial Supreme Court, it would have given them more direct involvement in the case, and the right to appeal in the event the judge sided with the plaintiffs' request to allow same-sex marriage in the territory. The case was again put off again for nearly another three weeks, and was set to resume on July 6. On June 30, the financial support for the Trudels evaporated. Their lawyer withdrew his services, and the Trudels decided to proceed alone, without legal representation.

On July 6, Ruby Trudel, alone, testified before the Supreme Court. She apologised to the court for her lack of knowledge of court procedures, and said that she was not homophobic: "While we do not support, encourage or endorse their lifestyle, we hold nothing against them personally." She said that those who promote the exclusion of same-sex couples from marriage have been "rendered voiceless at the federal level." Actually, the debates in the Canadian Senate were in full swing at that time. She expressed concern over the possibility of persecution of Christian clergy if same-sex marriage were to become legalised. She said: "If the application before this court were to succeed, there is every reason to believe that repercussions against people of conscience and religion....will soon begin to occur here also." They asked that the court not impose costs on them: "Costs incurred to this point already exceed our ability to pay."

A ruling never came from the territorial Supreme Court, and royal assent was granted to the Civil Marriage Act on July 20, 2005, legalising same-sex marriage nationwide in Canada. Perrino and Snow were awarded $5,000 in legal fees to cover court costs. On October 17, 2005, Supreme Court Justice Virginia Schuler ordered the Federal Government, and therefore Canadian taxpayers, to reimburse the plaintiffs for costs they incurred during their legal challenge. Perrino and Snow married following the legalisation of same-sex marriage in the territory.

Territorial legislation
In June 2002, the Legislative Assembly of the Northwest Territories approved amendments to the Adoption Act allowing same-sex couples to adopt children jointly, and the Family Law Act changing the definition of spouse to grant same-sex couples limited legal rights. Further legislation was passed in March 2005.

On March 7, 2017, the Legislative Assembly approved the Marriage Act. The Act defines marriage as "a voluntary union of two persons to the exclusion of all others", and uses gender-neutral language when referring to spouses. It received royal assent by interim Commissioner Gerald Kisoun on March 10, and went into effect on June 1, 2017.

Marriage statistics
The 2016 Canadian census showed that there were 75 same-sex couples living in the Northwest Territories.

Religious performance
In July 2019, the synod of the Anglican Church of Canada narrowly rejected a motion to authorise same-sex marriage and allow clergy in the church to officiate at such marriages. Instead, the church synod passed a resolution known as "A Word to the Church", allowing its dioceses to choose whether to perform same-sex marriages. Clergy of the Diocese of The Arctic, including Bishop David Parsons, have been vocally opposed to the solemnisation of same-sex marriages within the church. Following the passage of the resolution, several dioceses, including those of Ottawa and Rupert's Land, announced they would permit their clergy to solemnise same-sex marriages in accordance with the new resolution passed by the church synod. The Diocese of The Arctic chose to distance itself from these dioceses, but, responding to concerns that it might be leaving the Anglican Church of Canada, it released a statement, "The Diocese of the Arctic remains a diocese within the Anglican Church of Canada, but must distance itself from those who violate the marriage canon. The implication of this is a state of ‘impaired communion'."

See also
Same-sex marriage in Canada
LGBT rights in Canada

Notes

References

External links

Northwest Territories
Northwest Territories law
2005 in LGBT history